John Crane (born April 7, 1935) is a Canadian politician. He represented the electoral district of Harbour Grace in the Newfoundland and Labrador House of Assembly from 1989 to 1995. He is a member of the Liberal Party of Newfoundland and Labrador. He is a businessman.

References

1935 births
Living people
Progressive Conservative Party of Newfoundland and Labrador MHAs